Selski Vrh is a dispersed settlement in the Municipality of Slovenske Konjice in eastern Slovenia. It lies in the hills east of Loče and west of Poljčane. The area is part of the traditional region of Styria. The municipality is now included in the Savinja Statistical Region.

Name
The name of the settlement was changed from Vrh to Selski Vrh in 1953.

References

External links
Selski Vrh at Geopedia

Populated places in the Municipality of Slovenske Konjice